615 Roswitha is a minor planet orbiting the Sun.

References

External links
 
 

Background asteroids
Roswitha
Roswitha
CX-type asteroids (Tholen)
19061011